The 45×90 points are the four points on Earth which are both halfway between the geographical poles and the equator, and halfway between the Prime Meridian and the 180th meridian. Both northern 45×90 points are located on land, while both southern 45×90 points are in remote open ocean locations.

45°N, 90°W

A grand board and precise metal ground marker was placed by the Marathon County Park Commission, only to be relocated slightly and restored to visitor access since September 12, 2017.

The former marker has been replaced by a small parking lot with a trail that leads to a long, rectangular park. The Geographical Marker is at the southern end of the park along with informational displays.

The point has become something of a pop culture phenomenon thanks to Gesicki's Tavern in the tiny cluster of establishments in Poniatowski. They sold 45×90 T-shirts and registered visitors as members of the "45×90 Club". Since 2006, the Wausau/Central Wisconsin Convention & Visitors Bureau has been the holder of the official "45×90 Club" registration book. The book is on loan from the family. On becoming a member of the club, the Bureau gives a commemorative coin.

45°N, 90°E
Administratively, it is on the border of Qitai and Qinggil counties. Greg Michaels, an American, and Ru Rong Zhao, a taxi driver from the closest town of Qitai, which is 110 km to the south-southwest, visited this point on April 13, 2004 and documented the visit on the Degree Confluence Project. Their visit found no monument or any physical recognition of the status and documented that the nearest community to the site documented on maps, Jiangjunmiao, had long since been abandoned.

45°S, 90°E

In March 2014, the point was in one of a few strips in a search for the missing Malaysia Airlines Flight 370, after potential debris were spotted by satellite about there.

45°S, 90°W

Antipodes 

Each 45×90 point is the antipode - the point on the opposite side of the each - of another 45×90 point.

The southern Indian Ocean location and the point in Wisconsin are antipodes of each other. The southern Pacific Ocean location and the point in China are antipodes of each other.

See also
Degree Confluence Project (DCP)
45th parallel north
45th parallel south
90th meridian east
90th meridian west

References

External links
The 45th Parallel, Poniatowski, Wisconsin
Visit to the 45X90 point in Wisconsin (DCP)
Visit to the 45X90 point in northwestern China (DCP)

Cartography
Geography of Marathon County, Wisconsin
Geography of Wisconsin
Geography of Xinjiang
Indian Ocean
Lists of coordinates
Navigation
Pacific Ocean
Tourist attractions in Marathon County, Wisconsin